The Freedom People's Front (abbreviated FPF;  Nidahas Janathā Peramuna;  Cutantira Makkaḷ Muṉṉaṇi) is a Sri Lankan political party founded by Dr Nalaka Godahewa as the Bahujana Viyath Peramuna. The party has existed since 2018 but was not registered by the Election Commission of Sri Lanka until December 2022. Since then, the party is recognized as one of the 12 constituent parties of the Freedom People's Alliance formed alongside the Sri Lanka Freedom Party (SLFP) in January 2023.

The party founder and leader, Dr. Godahewa, is also a member of the Freedom Peoples Congress, a political party consisting of a group of MPs led by Dullas Alahapperuma who broke ranks with the SLPP, the incumbent ruling party of Sri Lanka, in 2022. Both parties are members of the Freedom People's Alliance.

The alliance will be contesting in the upcoming local government elections under the name "Freedom People's Front" and the helicopter symbol.

References 

2022 establishments in Sri Lanka
Nationalist parties in Sri Lanka
Political parties established in 2022
Political parties in Sri Lanka